Dargoron was a Serbian power/progressive metal band.

Band history 
Dargoron was formed in 2002 by Nikola Janković (vocals), Zlatko Nikolić (guitar), Aleksandar Jelenić (bass guitar) and Darko Lazarević (drums). They had their first performance at the Open Air festival in Smederevo on August 9, 2002. In November 2002 Marko Cakić, former member of Kvantni Skok, replaced Aleksandar Jelenić on bass guitar. At the time Janković stopped playing rhythm guitar and has focused on singing.

In January 2005, after some members have finished their military service, the band recorded songs for their first album in Paradox studio (owned by AlogiA members), but the band released the album only after they won the Demo Masters competition, organized by Radio Beograd 202. Dargoron was voted the best band by both jury and the audience.  Dargoron's debut self-titled album was released on June 20, 2006 through Active Time Records.  After the album release the band performed at the 40th Gitarijada.

Recording and production of the material that was released on the band's second album were completed by the middle of 2007. Raskršće snova (Crossroads of Dreams) was released in 2008. Track "Duša ratnika" was recorded with guest vocalists Zoran Lalović Lotke (Kraljevski Apartman frontman) and Marko Raco Max (Nightfall frontman).

In 2011, the band ended their activity.

Discography

Studio albums
Dargoron (2006)
Raskršće snova(2008)

References

External links
Official website
Dargoron at Spirit of Metal
Dargoron - Raskršće snova at RockSerbia

Serbian power metal musical groups
Serbian progressive metal musical groups
Musical groups from Smederevo